Sentinel Elementary School District No. 71 is a public school district based in the unincorporated community of Sentinel in Maricopa County, Arizona, United States. Its mailing address is officially in Dateland, Arizona, which is in Yuma County.

Average (estimated) teacher salary in 2022 fiscal year is $60,372.

References

External links
 

School districts in Maricopa County, Arizona